Publix Super Markets, Inc., commonly known as Publix, is an employee-owned American supermarket chain headquartered in Lakeland, Florida. Founded in 1930 by George W. Jenkins, Publix is a private corporation that is wholly owned by present and past employees and members of the Jenkins family. Publix operates throughout the Southeastern United States, with locations in Florida (847), Georgia (203), Alabama (87), South Carolina (68), Tennessee (55), North Carolina (52), and Virginia (19).

Publix maintains 1,331 store locations across the Southeast. As of December 2022, Florida has the largest number of stores, with 847, representing about 63.6% of total locations. As of September 2022, Publix employs about 240,000 people at its 1,331 retail locations, cooking schools, corporate offices, nine grocery distribution centers, and eleven manufacturing facilities. The manufacturing facilities produce its dairy, deli, bakery, and other food products.  Publix is the largest employee-owned company in the United States.

History

Early history

George Jenkins previously worked as a stock clerk and a manager at Piggly Wiggly from 1926 to 1930. When Jenkins decided to open his own grocery store, he adopted the name "Publix" from a struggling New York-based movie theater company (with 19 opulently decorated movie houses in Florida) called Publix Theatres Corporation. Jenkins stated “Most of the theaters were closing up, and I liked the sound of the name, so I just took it for my store.” Jenkins opened the first Publix Food Store in Winter Haven, Florida, on September 6, 1930, a 3,000 square foot building located at 58 Northwest 4th Street. In 1934, that store made $120,000 in sales. In 1935, he opened a second market, the Economy Food Store, also in Winter Haven. Despite the Great Depression, his stores were financially successful.

In 1940, Jenkins, called "Mr. George" by his employees, mortgaged an orange grove to build Florida's first supermarket. On November 8, 1940, his "food palace" opened at 199 West Central Avenue, having piped-in music, air conditioning, cold cases for frozen and refrigerated items, in-store doughnut and flower shops, and electric-eye automatic doors. During World War II, material shortages prevented him from building additional stores. In 1945, Jenkins purchased the 19-store All American chain of food stores and converted them into Publix Super Markets.

In 1951, Publix moved its headquarters from Winter Haven to Lakeland, Florida, and built its first distribution warehouse there. At the same time, they began to close the All American stores, replacing them with Publix markets. In 1956, Publix achieved $50 million in sales, and $1 million in profit. In 1957, the donut shop in each store was expanded into a full-service bakery.

Florida expansion

By 1959, Publix was the dominant supermarket chain in Central Florida, and began expansion to South Florida, opening a store in Miami and acquiring six stores from Grand Union. In 1963, the company built a distribution center in Miami, and began providing deli services. In 1970, sales surpassed $500 million; they reached $1 billion in 1974, when the chain expanded to include Jacksonville, Florida.

In 1982, the company launched the Presto! ATM network; it soon installed ATMs in every Publix. Sales exceeded $5 billion in 1989.

In 1983, Carol Jenkins Barnett joined the Publix Board of Directors and served in that role until 2016. During her time at Publix, the company grew into the largest supermarket chain in Florida, and expanded into five other states.

On October 5, 1995, Publix opened its 500th store in Miami, Florida.

Publix Super Markets bought 49 Florida stores from Albertsons. The deal was announced on June 9, 2008, and was completed on September 9, 2008. It included 15 locations in North Florida, 30 in Central Florida, and four in South Florida. The sale allowed Publix to operate four stores in a new market area for the company, Escambia County, Florida (the Pensacola area).

On February 5, 2009, Publix opened its 1,000th store in St. Augustine, Florida, becoming one of only five U.S. grocery retailers to achieve that number of stores. The St. Augustine store is among Publix's first stores designed to be energy-efficient. The store includes motion sensor lights throughout the store, including on the freezer doors, and an overhead light system that can be controlled by each department.

Southern and Mid-Atlantic expansion
The first Publix outside Florida opened in Savannah, Georgia, in 1991; distribution and manufacturing facilities in Dacula, Georgia (a northeastern suburb of Atlanta) soon followed, as it entered metro Atlanta in 1993. Publix further expanded into South Carolina (1993), Alabama (1996), Tennessee (2002), North Carolina (2014), and Virginia (2017), and has announced plans to expand into Kentucky (2023).

In 2011, Publix announced it was expanding into North Carolina, initially by opening stores in the Charlotte metropolitan area, and later announced construction of a new store in Asheville. The first Charlotte-area Publix stores (on the South Carolina side of the metropolitan area, opened in 2012); the first North Carolina Publix store opened in Ballantyne in 2014.  Concurrently, Publix purchased seven Charlotte-area locations from competitor BI-LO stores. Publix completed the purchase of property in Boone, North Carolina on November 20, 2015, with plans to open in 2017.

In February 2016, Publix announced their entry into the Virginia market, with the signing of two store leases, the first in Bristol scheduled to open in 2017 and the second in metropolitan Richmond scheduled for 2018. In July 2016, it was announced that Publix had entered into a purchase agreement with Ahold and Delhaize Group for 10 Martin's Food Markets locations in the Richmond market as part of the divestiture of stores to gain clearance from the Federal Trade Commission for the impending Ahold/Delhaize merger.

In April 2016, Ed Crenshaw, grandson of founder George Jenkins, retired from his position as CEO. President Todd Jones, a 36-year Publix employee whose first job was as a front service clerk (bagger), took on Crenshaw's responsibilities as CEO. Jones is the first member outside of the Jenkins family to have assumed the position. Ed Crenshaw will remain with Publix as chairman of the board of directors.

Kentucky expansion 
On September 7, 2021, Publix announced its first Kentucky location, expected to open in late 2023 in northeast Louisville near the intersection of the Gene Snyder Freeway and Old Henry Road. The first Publix Liquors location outside Florida will be adjacent to this supermarket. Exactly three months later, Publix announced plans for a second northeast Louisville location, this one near the intersection of Ballardsville and Brownsboro Roads in the Worthington community. Expected to open in early 2024, this location will also feature an adjacent Publix Liquors store. On June 23, 2022, the same day that ground was broken for the Old Henry Road store, the company announced that it had signed a lease for a future store in Lexington at a development on the corner of Harrodsburg Road and Man o' War Boulevard. The Lexington store, including an adjacent Publix Liquors location, is planned to open in late 2024.

Response to the COVID-19 pandemic
During the COVID-19 pandemic, Publix started working with the federal and state agencies and the Centers for Disease Control and Prevention (CDC) beginning in late January 2020. The chain closed food demonstrations, and increased sanitation and routine cleaning, as well as installing plexiglas partitions at registers and customer service desks. As of July 21, 2020, face masks were required for all customers in all Publix facilities.

During the pandemic, Publix said it would purchase milk and fresh produce from farmers and dairies in Florida who faced reduced demand as a result of school and restaurant closures. Publix said the produce, which would otherwise be discarded, would be donated to food banks of Feeding America.

Publix started to administer COVID-19 vaccines in early January 2021, with a 22-store pilot in the state of Florida with a focus on long-term care residents and staff, seniors, and health-care personnel. As of mid-February, Publix had provided more than 300,000 vaccines for customers in Florida, Georgia, South Carolina and Virginia. Publix has faced criticism over its extensive involvement in the distribution of vaccines in Florida, including allegations that it had curried favor with the Ron DeSantis administration by making a campaign donation through an affiliated PAC, and that Publix as exclusive distributor disproportionately favored wealthy neighborhoods.

Publix and the DeSantis administration deny that there was a pay to play arrangement; in an April 2021 interview with 60 Minutes, DeSantis stated that Publix "were the first one to raise their hand" when Florida sought distribution partners for vaccines in retail (noting that CVS Health and Walgreens were largely focusing on vaccination at long-term care facilities), and that 90% of Florida's senior population lived in close proximity to a Publix location, especially in Palm Beach (which has 65 locations, and was identified by the Governor as "one of the most elderly counties"). These remarks were not included in the version of the interview aired by CBS, which has led to allegations that the interview had been edited to create a false narrative. The Democratic Party Mayor of Palm Beach County Dave Kerner stated, "The reporting was not just based on bad information — it was intentionally false. I know this because I offered to provide my insight into Palm Beach County's vaccination efforts and 60 Minutes declined."

Stores 

Each store provides products and services in its grocery, deli, bakery, produce, floral, meat, and seafood departments. Some stores have valet parking, cafés, sushi bars, pharmacy departments, and/or a liquor store. The submarine sandwiches sold at Publix delis are often referred to as "Pub subs".

The customer service counter also provides check cashing, money orders, Western Union services, Rug Doctor rentals, and lottery tickets. Some stores also provide DVD rental services. In December 2005, Publix discontinued its photo processing service, replacing it with an online or mail-order service via the Snapfish program. The Snapfish agreement has since been terminated, and Publix no longer offers photo services.

Aprons 
Publix operates 11 cooking schools under the Aprons name.
The schools offer cooking demonstrations in which customers are encouraged to sample a variety of dishes prepared at in-store kiosks and take a recipe card with them. All recipes are developed in-house, using easy-to-prepare or prepackaged ingredients, often available at the Aprons kiosk.

In 2005, Publix introduced its Aprons make-ahead meals concept. Customers could purchase meals that they could assemble in-store or, for an extra charge, an Aprons associate would prepare and assemble the meals. These were standalone stores located in Jacksonville and Lithia, Florida. In summer 2009, Publix closed both locations citing lack of customer interest.

Publix GreenWise Market 

GreenWise Market is a retail concept the company introduced in 2007 in response to the increase in the number and profitability of health food stores such as Whole Foods Market. GreenWise Markets were created to increase awareness of nutrition; products under the GreenWise brand are free from added dyes, flavors, hormones, raised without antibiotics, or are USDA organic. These stores are similar to the Whole Foods Market chain. In addition to organic and traditional products, GreenWise Markets include salad and hot bars. The first six stores were set to be in Palm Beach Gardens, Boca Raton, Vero Beach, Tampa, Naples, and Coral Springs, Florida.

The first GreenWise Market opened on September 27, 2007, in Palm Beach Gardens. The second Publix GreenWise Market opened in Boca Raton on May 29, 2008, located in Boca Village Square. The third Publix GreenWise Market opened November 6, 2008, in Tampa's Hyde Park neighborhood.

From 2008 to 2016, the company focused on a "hybrid" concept instead, integrating the GreenWise concept into traditional Publix stores. Approximately half of locations built since 2008 are considered hybrid stores.

In 2017, the company announced they would resume building standalone GreenWise locations, the first of which will be near the campus of Florida State University in Tallahassee, opening in 2018.

Publix Sabor
Publix operated seven stores, branded "Publix Sabor" (sabor is Spanish for "flavor"), which cater to Latinos living in South Florida and offer products from Latin America. Located in Miami-Dade County in Greater Miami, the seven themed stores are spread between Miami and Hialeah. They have since been closed and replaced by newly built locations or merged with existing stores that are not part of the Sabor sub-brand. Two other Publix Sabor locations in Kissimmee and Lake Worth

Publix Sabor locations have bilingual English-Spanish employees, open seating cafés, and a wider selection of prepared foods from the deli and bakery catering to Hispanic flavors.

Pharmacy

The first Publix in-store pharmacy was opened on October 30, 1986, in Altamonte Springs, Florida. By 1995, one-third of Publix stores had a pharmacy and today, approximately 90% of Publix stores include a pharmacy. Publix Pharmacies consistently ranked number one for customer satisfaction in supermarket pharmacies in several surveys conducted by independent research companies.

Free medications
Publix announced in August 2007, that it would offer several types of antibiotics free to its customers. Customers must have a prescription; they are given a maximum of a two-week supply. Several medical professionals expressed concerns that this could contribute to an overuse of antibiotics which leads to antibiotic resistance, a serious public health concern. These medications include:
 Amoxicillin (excluding Amoxicillin/clavulanic acid)
 Ampicillin
 Penicillin VK and
 Sulfamethoxazole-trimethoprim (SMZ-TMP) (Excluding liquid SMZ-TMP)

These antibiotics are offered to customers regardless of their prescription insurance provider. Doxycycline Hyclate was removed from the list because of cost increases. In May 2014, Cephalexin was removed from the list due to cost increases.

In March 2010, Publix announced the launch of another free prescription, Metformin for Type II Diabetes, the generic of Glucophage. Publix provides the medication in 500 mg, 850 mg, and 1000 mg strengths. The only restriction is a 90-day supply or up to 360 500-mg, 270 850-mg, or 225 1000-mg tablets, but refills are not limited.

In August 2011, Publix began offering Lisinopril, an ACE inhibitor that is used to prevent, treat, or improve symptoms of high blood pressure, certain heart conditions, diabetes, and certain chronic kidney conditions, as another free prescription. Customers can get a 90-day supply of this prescription for free at any Publix Pharmacy, up to a maximum of 180 tablets. Lisinopril-HCTZ combination products are excluded.

In May 2014, Publix began offering Amlodipine, a calcium channel blocker used to treat high blood pressure and chest pain (angina) as a free medication. Customers can get a 90-day supply of this medication (up to 180 2.5-mg or 5-mg tablets, or 90 10-mg tablets) free of charge.

Montelukast, a medicine used for the treatment of allergies and asthma, was added to the free medication program in February 2017, but discontinued at the end of 2018.

The Little Clinic
In early 2006, Publix and The Little Clinic signed an exclusive agreement to open medical clinics within Publix stores. The first clinics were opened in the Atlanta, Miami, Orlando, and Tampa markets in the first half of 2006. The Little Clinic health-care centers were staffed by nurse practitioners who can write prescriptions, provide diagnosis and treatment of common ailments and minor injuries, and offer wellness care like physicals, screenings, and vaccinations. Effective May 9, 2011, Publix closed the Little Clinics in its stores in order to focus on its core pharmacy and grocery business.

BayCare telehealth sites 
Publix and BayCare Health System announced a collaboration to provide telehealth and telemedicine services at specialized pharmacies in four Tampa Bay-area counties in March 2017. Pharmacies participating in the program have private rooms for patients to speak with a board-certified physician in BayCare's network via teleconferencing, plus diagnostic tools that can be used by the patient, with or without assistance from pharmacy staff. Doctors will be able to perform basic exams and write prescriptions for minor illnesses and conditions for patients.

Online shopping and delivery services

PublixDirect 
In October 2001, Publix launched its first online shopping site called PublixDirect that would deliver groceries directly to the customer. Their first distribution center was situated in Pompano Beach, Florida. Customers who lived in Broward along with parts of Miami-Dade and Palm Beach counties were the first areas to have access to their new service. Service was intended to be expanded to Orlando, Atlanta and other areas. However, the service never saw expansion past the South Florida area. Due to low demand, it was announced that PublixDirect would cease operations on August 22, 2003. The remaining deliveries were made the next day with the remaining orders being canceled or redirected to the customer's nearest Publix store.

Publix Curbside 
After PublixDirect, Publix made a second attempt in 2010 at e-commerce with the introduction of Publix Curbside. Customers had the ability to browse and purchase groceries online, then drive to a participating location where an associate will have selected their items and would bring them out to the buyer's vehicle. Announced as a pilot program with locations in the Atlanta area and Tampa, the program was ended in January 2012 after its performance reportedly did not meet expectations.

The company later resurrected its curbside concept, this time using its delivery partner, Instacart, to manage the online ordering portion of the service. Currently in a trial stage, the second iteration of Publix Curbside began with two pilot locations in the greater Tampa area in September 2017, and is expected to expand to the greater Atlanta area by the end of the year.

Instacart 
In July 2016, Publix announced another pilot program with Instacart to offer online shopping and delivery services in the greater Miami area. Customers in 37 ZIP codes from Hallandale Beach to South Miami are able to participate in the program. Not all products available at stores, [such as tobacco, gift cards, prescriptions] and age-restricted items, are able to be delivered by the service. Beer and wine can be delivered in Florida and North Carolina only.

As of February 2017, Instacart deliveries from Publix are available in the metro areas of Atlanta, Charlotte, Fort Lauderdale, Miami, Orlando, Raleigh, Richmond, Tampa, Jacksonville, and Nashville, as determined by ZIP code.

Later in 2017, Publix announced its intent to expand its delivery program, and expects to have the service available from more than 90 percent of stores by the end of the year.

Food World 
In response to other grocery stores' aggressive discounting across the Florida market, Publix opened its first Food World store in September 1970 in Orlando, Florida. The store marked the first under the Food World banner for Publix and would become the first of 22 more of the type.

In November 1977, in Lakeland, Florida, Publix opened the Lake Miriam Food World, which, at 57,000 sq. ft., was its largest store in the company and also the largest store in the Southeastern United States. The store was the company's first to feature barcode scanners.

The brand was retired in 1985 because the stores were unable to turn a profit for Publix or give workers a percentage of their store's profits.

Publix PIX 
Starting in 2001, Publix operated 14 PIX (stylized in all-capitals) gasoline-convenience stores in Florida, Georgia, and Tennessee. Locations were limited during the trial period of the concept. In 2014, all Florida and Georgia locations were sold to Circle K, the sole Tennessee location was sold to another entity, and the concept was discontinued. The locations were converted to other brands, as Publix retains the rights to "PIX."

Crispers 
In 2002, Publix invested in the Lakeland-based restaurant chain Crispers, which concentrates on health-conscious fare. It increased its stake in 2004 before purchasing the remainder of the company in 2007. In May 2011, Publix announced it had sold the Crispers chain to Healthy Food Concepts LLC. The stores had not performed well during the downturn and in recent years Publix closed several units, leaving the chain with 36 stores when the sale was announced.

Publix Liquors 
Publix tested the market response to liquor stores in the late 1980s, but closed its test sites in 1989. It re-entered the liquor sales market again in 2003 and has met with success since. The liquor store is in an area accessed via a separate entrance as required by local laws, modeled after many other grocery chains. All Publix Liquors locations to date have been in Florida; the first such stores outside that state are planned to open in late 2023 and early 2024 in Louisville, Kentucky.

DVD rental kiosks 
In 2005, Publix began installing The New Release DVD rental kiosks within eight of its South Florida stores with expansion to other South Florida stores by 2006. The movie rentals were priced at $1 per day in addition to sales tax.

Following the purchase of The New Release by NCR in 2009, a partnership was formed with the NCR company and Blockbuster to replace the existing kiosks with Blockbuster Express kiosks. This replacement began the same year with additional kiosks being installed at all of the other Publix locations which was completed by 2010. The cost of the rentals remained the same.

In 2012, NCR sold its entertainment division, which includes the Blockbuster Express kiosks, to Coinstar, the owner of the Redbox DVD rental kiosks. Blockbuster Express machines were replaced with Redbox machines in most stores by the end of 2012.

Starbucks 
In December 2016, Publix opened its first in-store Starbucks location in the Orlando area, with five more opening throughout 2017.

Presto! 

Presto! is an automated teller machine (ATM) network owned and operated by Publix Super Markets. There are over 1,100 Presto! ATMs in Florida, Alabama, Georgia, North Carolina, South Carolina, and Tennessee, all located at Publix retail stores. This network includes point of sale (POS) capabilities, meaning that debit, credit, electronic benefit transfer (EBT) cash, or EBT food stamp cards can be used to make purchases at any Publix store.

Working environment 

The company, founded in 1930, has never had a layoff.

In 1995 Publix was sued "for sex discrimination in job assignments, promotions and allocation of hours" and settled for $81.5 million in 1997. Publix had claimed that the suit was simply an effort by the United Food and Commercial Workers to unionize the company, but the judge ruled in favor of the plaintiffs and required Publix to "correct some of its statements."

Publix announced that effective January 1, 2015, health coverage would be available to same-sex couples regardless of place of marriage, as long as they are legally married.  In early 2018, Publix came under fire by the Human Rights Campaign and other LGBT rights organizations for refusing to cover PrEP HIV prevention drugs under its employee health plans.  Shortly after the furor, Publix changed its health plans to cover PrEP.

Political giving 
Publix Political giving is coordinated through their Political Action Committee (PAC), which the company leverages to promote business interests. As with other large corporations, the company operates independently of the Jenkins family as a separate entity. The ideas and contributions of these members does not reflect the views or business operations of Publix Super Markets.

According to the Miami New Times, Publix' recent political leanings favor conservative causes, such as opposing the legalization of medical marijuana and the regulation of polystyrene, better known by the brand name Styrofoam. Publix also contributes to the PAC supporting Ron Desantis, whom some conservatives argue is a business-friendly governor. Following the Stoneman Douglas High School shooting, contributions to other conservative leaders - specifically Adam Putnam - resulted in local protests in the Miami Area. ". Moments before the protests began, the company announced that it would suspend corporate-funded political contributions and reevaluate their political funding practices. Six days after halting political contributions, the Florida Retail Federation, a trade group heavily funded (>80% in 2017) by Publix, donated an additional $100,000 to Putnam's Florida Grown PAC.

In December 2020, Publix gave $100,000 to Florida governor Ron DeSantis' PAC. While many attribute to this donation Publix's ability to provide some of the first access to the vaccine for Florida residents, both the Governor and Publix spokeswoman Maria Brous rejected this claim as "baseless and ridiculous". Publix was able to distribute vaccines to seniors in their markets, while national providers like Walgreens and CVS focused on broader efforts.

Stock

Publix stock is privately owned and restricted: it can only be purchased by current employees or board members during designated offering periods, and cannot be sold to anyone without first being offered back to Publix for repurchase.

Stock was made available to associates in 1959, originally priced at $10.00 per share.
Employees can acquire stock through three programs: an ESOP "PROFIT" plan, 401(k) "SMART" (Saving Makes A Richer Tomorrow) plan, and an employee stock purchase plan.

As of May 1, 2022, Publix stock is valued at $13.76 per share after a 5/1 stock split April 1, 2022. Publix stock was quoted on the US OTC market under the code PUSH. It is listed on the 2021 Fortune 500 list at #69. As of November 2019, the stock is no longer listed on the OTC.

Locations

Distribution centers
Distribution centers are located in:
 Alabama
 McCalla – non-perishables
 Florida
 Boynton Beach – grocery
 Deerfield Beach – perishables
 Jacksonville – dairy, frozen food, grocery, meat, produce
 Lakeland – frozen food, grocery, meat, dairy, produce, general merchandise (low velocity)
 Miami – grocery
 Orlando – frozen food, meat, produce, grocery, pharmacy
 Sarasota – grocery
 Georgia
 Dacula – dairy, frozen food, grocery, meat, produce, general merchandise (low velocity)
North Carolina
Greensboro

Manufacturing facilities
Manufacturing facilities are located in:
 Florida
 Deerfield Beach – dairy, fresh foods
 Jacksonville – fresh foods
 Lakeland – bakery, dairy, deli, fresh foods, fresh kitchen, printing services
 Georgia
 Dacula – dairy, fresh foods
 Atlanta – bakery

Support offices
 Florida
 Lakeland – corporate offices, IT data center, flight center, programming and IT support, call center and customer care
 Jacksonville – offices
 Miami – offices
 Georgia
 Marietta – offices
 Alpharetta – IT data center
 North Carolina
 Charlotte – offices

Legal disputes 
In 2003, Publix supported a successful bill that prevents owners from suing if their land is polluted by dry cleaning chemicals dumped on an adjacent property, if the adjacent property owners are on a state clean-up list.  Publix lost a 2001 lawsuit filed by an owner whose property had been contaminated in this manner.

On October 4, 2005, Publix sued Visa and MasterCard, citing unfair business practices over their unannounced and non-negotiable increases in merchant account fees. Wal-Mart won a similar lawsuit against Visa in 2004.

In 2014, Publix was fined by the Board of Human Rights of Broward County, Florida for discrimination involved in the termination of an LGBT employee. Upon appeal, the 17th Circuit Court found that the decision by the Board of Human Rights of Broward County was "not supported by competent, substantial evidence" and quashed the order.

See also 
 Carol Jenkins Barnett
 Howard Jenkins

References

External links 

 
 Publix stockholder information
 

1930 establishments in Florida
Companies based in Lakeland, Florida
Employee-owned companies of the United States
Financial services companies of the United States
Health care companies based in Florida
Interbank networks
Pharmacies of the United States
Privately held companies based in Florida
American companies established in 1930
Retail companies established in 1930
Presto!
Supermarkets of the United States
Economy of the Southeastern United States